Kfeir is a small village nestled 900 m above sea level, in Hasbaiya District (Qada'a), an administrative division of Nabatiyeh Governorate (Mohafazah) along the steep slopes of the top of the  Jebel Sheikh in Lebanon.

The village enjoys mild summers of an average temperature of 25ºC.  However, the winters are much colder and the village receives heavy snow. Kfeir's high altitude allows fog to form above the hills even in summer, giving the village a mystical and spiritual scenery.

The inhabitants of Kfeir are Christians and Druze, and they mainly cultivate olives, pines and other fruit trees.

Notable people 

 Emily Nasrallah, Lebanese novelist
 Fares al-Khoury, Syrian politician
 Issam Abou Jamra, former Deputy Prime Minister of Lebanon
 Fadi Abou Jamra, candidate for the 2018 Lebanese general election
 Assaf Abu Rahhal, Lebanese journalist killed in the 2010 Israel–Lebanon border clash

References
St. George's Youth Organization in Kfeir

External links
 http://www.kfeir.com/
Kfayr Ez Zait, Localiban

Populated places in Hasbaya District
Maronite Christian communities in Lebanon
Eastern Orthodox Christian communities in Lebanon